Lucasville can refer to:

 Lucasville, Ohio
 Lucasville, Ontario
 Lucasville, Nova Scotia
 Southern Ohio Correctional Facility (commonly referred to as Lucasville)